Air Force Junior Reserve Officer Training Corps (AFJROTC) is a subdivision of the Junior Reserve Officer Training Corps (JROTC). JROTC is a junior military science elective class that is offered in many high schools across the United States. The class is the high school version of the college ROTC (Reserve Officer Training Corps). The Air Force division of JROTC is composed of physical training, aerospace science academic classes, and leadership skill creation. Outside of the formal class, there are extra-curricular teams that cadets may participate in to create qualities of leadership and followership. Unlike the collegiate version of ROTC, upon completion of JROTC there is no military service required. This allows the youth of the United States to experience the military without having long-term commitments.

Mission statement
Develop citizens of character dedicated to serving their nation and community.

History 
Air Force Junior Reserve Officer Training Corps was founded in 1911 in Cheyenne, Wyoming, by Army Lt. Edgar R. Steevers. He created the program with the idea in mind to create more enlightened and higher quality citizens for the United States of America as well to educate young people about the military and its functions. AFJROTC is found at approximately 800 high schools across the nation as of 2014 and that number continues to grow.

Chain of command and classroom procedures 
AFJROTC is unique in its class procedures than typical classes that one takes in high school. AFJROTC is structured to be run predominantly by cadets, with the supervision of the Senior Aerospace Science Instructor (Teacher). Every Corps of Cadets has a chain of command similar to that in the actual military. At the top of the chain there is the Corps Commander who has his/her cabinet of officers below them that are in charge of the tasks of the corps. The senior staff of cadets along with the Corps Commander decides what activities the Corps will partake in and/or sponsor. The SASI (Senior Aerospace Science Instructor) oversees the activities and helps the corps achieve their goals.

Curriculum 
Curriculum in Air Force Junior Reserve Officer Training Corps is spent instructing cadets about leadership, aerospace science, and how to become enlightened citizens. Leadership instruction is achieved by partial study of the matter, but is predominantly experience based. There are multiple leadership positions that cadets can hold that vary from Corps to Corps, but one similarity between all Corps is the chain of command that each one functions by. Cadets can work their way up the ladder of leadership in order to develop their skills. Instruction in aerospace science consists primarily of the study of aerodynamics, the history of the Air Force, and the protocol of being a cadet in the Air Force JROTC program.

Uniform wear 
AFJROTC cadets wear the same uniform as active duty United States Air Force members. The Air Force requires that at least once a week AFJROTC cadets must wear the uniform properly and be inspected by their Senior Aerospace Science Instructor for accuracy. Cadets will also wear their uniform to parades, competitions, and ceremonial affairs. Cadets must learn how to properly adorn medals, ribbons, cords, badges, and other items awarded to cadets through their efforts put forth in the Corps.

Physical training 
Physical training in AFJROTC consists of training the individual cadets to the Air Force’s standards of physical fitness for AFJROTC cadets. The training consists of physical examinations once an academic quarter (2 ½ months) to track progress and increase the physical abilities and limitations of the cadets. The fitness tests consist of flexibility testing, push-ups, sit-ups, pull-ups, sprinting exercises, and cardiovascular endurance via a one-mile run. Each quarter of the academic school year, cadets are tested on these qualities and their progress is tracked. Awards may be presented to cadets based on their ability to perform physically.

Extracurricular activities 
AFJROTC requires that cadets wear the uniform, participate in academics, and participate in physical fitness. Cadets do not have to participate in extra-curricular activities, however they are encouraged in order to advance in leadership positions and develop esprit de corps. Extra-curricular activities consist of regulation armed drill teams, regulation unarmed drill teams, exhibition armed drill teams, exhibition unarmed drill teams, cyber patriot (instruction on how to defend against cyber hacking), flag detail, color guard, and raider teams (team that competes in various physical events). All of these teams compete against other JROTC units, and these competitions are sponsored by high schools, the JROTC units themselves, and occasionally Air Force collaborations. The AFA (Air Force Association) is the most notable sponsor of AFJROTC events, and is most famous for hosting drill team meets. In addition to teams, there are many field trips and camps that are available to cadets to get involved in their respective corps. Examples of some of these field trips offered to cadets include aerospace museum visits, AC-135 refueling plane trips, and week-long military camps at institutes across the nation such as The Citadel, the United States Air Force Academy, VMI, and Norwich University.

Future opportunities 
After completing four years of AFJROTC, students are much more likely to obtain a collegiate scholarship for an ROTC program. If the individuals desire to attend college, but do not want to enroll in ROTC, having AFJROTC on one’s record allows a much higher chance of admission to universities. If cadets do not want to attend college, but desire to enlist in the military, then the military will offer an advancement of rank to those who were in JROTC for four years. Upon the completion of four years of AFJROTC and enlistment in the Air Force, the individual will enter as an E-3 instead of an E-1 (an advancement of two pay grades).

Notes

References 
"Air Force Junior ROTC Grant." - Air Force Association. N.p., n.d. Web. 19 Nov. 2014. <https://web.archive.org/web/20150211010745/http://www.afa.org/informationfor/teachers/k12grants/airforcejuniorrotcgrant>.
"Junior Reserve Officer Training Corps (JROTC)." Junior Reserve Officer Training Corps (JROTC). N.p., n.d. Web. 19 Nov. 2014. <https://kb.defense.gov/app/answers/detail/a_id/513/~/junior-reserve-officer-training-corps-(jrotc)>.
Welcome to AFJROTC Homepage." Welcome to AFJROTC Homepage. N.p., n.d. Web. 19 Nov. 2014. <http://www.au.af.mil/au/holmcenter/AFJROTC/index.asp>.
"Air Force National JROTC Drill Championships Series Homepage." Air Force National JROTC Drill Championships Series Homepage. N.p., n.d. Web. 19 Nov. 2014. <http://www.thenationals.net/af-nationals.htm>.
"AFJROTC - Mission, History, Creed." AFJROTC - Mission, History, Creed. N.p., n.d. Web. 19 Nov. 2014. <https://web.archive.org/web/20160303222156/http://cms.dsusd.k12.ca.us/education/components/scrapbook/default.php?sectiondetailid=61225&&PHPSESSID=02e2034e644f158ef0aee427ed10b177>.
Grier, Peter. "AFJROTC in a Holding Pattern." Air Force Magazine Jan. 2014: 57-59. Military and Government Collection. Web. 9 Nov. 2014.

Junior Reserve Officers' Training Corps